Ēriks Ešenvalds (born 26 January 1977) is a Latvian composer. From 2011 to 2013 he was Fellow Commoner in Creative Arts at Trinity College, University of Cambridge.

Biography
Ēriks Ešenvalds was born in Priekule, Latvia, in 1977. He studied at the Latvian Baptist Theological Seminary (1995–1997) before obtaining his master's degree in composition (2004) from the Latvian Academy of Music under the tutelage of Selga Mence. He took master classes with Michael Finnissy, Klaus Huber, Philippe Manoury and Jonathan Harvey, amongst others. From 2002 to 2011 he was a member of the State Choir Latvija. From 2011 to 2013 he was Fellow Commoner in Creative Arts at Trinity College, University of Cambridge. Ešenvalds is a three-time winner of the Latvian Grand Music Award (2005, 2007 and 2015). In 2006, the International Rostrum of Composers awarded him first prize for his work The Legend of the Walled-in Woman. Ešenvalds composed the official anthem of the 2014 World Choir Games during Riga European Capital of Culture 2014. Ešenvalds teaches at the Department of Composition of the Latvian Academy of Music.

Recordings
Ešenvalds's compositions appear on recordings released by labels such as Signum Records, Hyperion Records, Decca Classics, Deutsche Grammophon, Delphian Records, Pentatone and Ondine.

Recordings devoted exclusively to his work include:

 There Will Come Soft Rains — The Pacific Lutheran University Choir of the West, Richard Nance (cond.) (Signum, 2020)
 St Luke Passion Sacred Works — Latvian Radio Choir, Sinfonietta Riga and Sigvards Kļava (Ondine, 2016)
 Northern Lights & other choral works — Choir of Trinity College, Cambridge and Stephen Layton (Hyperion Records, 2015)
 At the Foot of the Sky — State Choir Latvija and Māris Sirmais (2013)
 Passion & Resurrection & other choral works — Britten Sinfonia, Polyphony and Stephen Layton (Hyperion Records, 2011)
 O Salutaris — Kamēr… Youth Choir and Māris Sirmais (2011)
 The Doors of Heaven — Portland State University Chamber Choir under Ethan Sperry (Naxos, 2017)
 Translations — Portland State University under Ethan Sperry (Naxos, 2020)

The album Northern Lights & other choral works was shortlisted for the Gramophone Awards 2015, selected as Gramophone Critics’ Choice 2015 and listed as ICI Radio-Canada Best Albums Selection in 2015. The albums At the Foot of the Sky (2013) and O Salutaris (2011) were awarded Best Classical Album of the Year in Latvia.

References

External links 
 
 Edition Peters Artist Management (Management)
 Musica Baltica (Publisher)
 Edition Peters (Publisher)
 Ēriks Ešenvalds on Hyperion Records
 Ēriks Ešenvalds on the Latvian Music Information Centre

See also
 List of Latvians
 Lists of composers

1977 births
20th-century composers
21st-century composers

Choral composers
Male composers
Latvian composers
20th-century Latvian people
People from Priekule Municipality
Living people
20th-century male musicians
21st-century male musicians